

Yallunda Flat is a locality in the Australian state of South Australia located on the Eyre Peninsula about  west of the state capital of Adelaide. Both its name and boundaries were created in 1998.  The name is derived from the local landform of the same name.  It includes the following two places which have been gazetted as "unbounded localities" – Kapinka and Urrano. Yallunda Flat is located within the federal division of Grey, the state electoral district of Flinders and the local government area of the District Council of Tumby Bay.

See also
List of cities and towns in South Australia
Eyre Peninsula bushfire

References

Towns in South Australia
Eyre Peninsula